

The Snead CG-11 was a proposed Second World War American transport glider to be built for the United States Army, none were built and the programme was cancelled.

Design and development
The CG-11 was a large transport glider with a seating capacity for 30 troops. Two prototypes were ordered on 22 April 1942 (serial numbers 42-68302/68303) together with a static test airframe but development was cancelled on 9 June 1943 following wind tunnel tests with models.

Specifications (CG-11)

See also

References

Further reading
 

1940s United States military gliders
Glider aircraft
Snead aircraft